The pharyngeal plexus is a network of nerve fibers innervating most of the palate and pharynx. (The larynx, which is innervated by the superior and recurrent laryngeal nerves from vagus nerve (CN X), is not included.)

It is located on the surface of the middle pharyngeal constrictor muscle.

Sources
Although the Terminologia Anatomica name of the plexus has "vagus nerve" in the title, other nerves make contributions to the plexus.

It has the following sources:
 CN IX – pharyngeal branches of glossopharyngeal nerve – sensory
 CN X – pharyngeal branch of vagus nerve – motor
 superior cervical ganglion sympathetic fibers – vasomotor

Because the cranial part of accessory nerve (CN XI) leaves the jugular foramen as a part of the CN X, it is sometimes considered part of the plexus as well.

Innervation

Sensory
The pharyngeal plexus provides sensory innervation of the oropharynx and laryngopharynx from CN IX and CN X. (The nasopharynx above the pharyngotympanic tube and the torus tubarius is innervated by CN V2).

Motor
The pharyngeal plexus, with fibers from CN IX, CN X, and cranial part of CN XI, innervates all the muscles of the pharynx (except stylopharyngeus, which is innervated directly by a branch of CN IX).

This includes the following muscles: palatopharyngeus, palatoglossus, musculus uvulae, the pharyngeal constrictors, salpingopharyngeus plus others.

Note that the intrinsic muscles of the larynx are innervated by the vagus nerve but not by the pharyngeal plexus. Instead, they are innervated by the recurrent laryngeal nerve and the external branch of the superior laryngeal nerve, branches of the vagus.

See also
 Superior cervical ganglion

Additional images

References

Nerve plexus
Vagus nerve
Human throat
Nerves of the head and neck
Pharynx